Polydontes is a genus of air-breathing land snails, terrestrial pulmonate gastropod molluscs in the subfamily Polydontinae  of the family Sagdidae.

Species 
Species in the genus Polydontes include:
 Polydontes acutangula (Burrow, 1815) - in Puerto Rico
 Polydontes apollo (Pfeiffer, 1860) - in Cuba
 Polydontes castrensis (L. Pfeiffer, 1857)
 Polydontes imperator (Montfort, 1810) - in Cuba
 Polydontes luquillensis (Shuttleworth, 1854) - in Puerto Rico
 Polydontes natensoni Torre, 1938
 Polydontes perplexa (Ferussac, 1821) - in the Lesser Antilles
 Polydontes sobrina (Férussac, 1819)
 Polydontes torrei Pilsbry, 1938
Species brought into synonymy
 Polydontes gigantea (Scopoli, 1786): synonym of Hispaniolana gigantea (Scopoli, 1786)
 Polydontes lima (Ferussac, 1821) - in Puerto Rico: synonym of Granodomus lima (Férussac, 1821)
 Polydontes lychnuchus (Muller, 1774) - in Guadeloupe Martinique: synonym of Pleurodonte lychnuchus (O. F. Müller, 1774)
 Polydontes undulata (Ferussac, 1821) - extinct(?) in Haiti: synonym of Hispaniolana crispatus (Férussac, 1821) (based on invalid original name)

References

External links 
 Montfort P. [Denys de. (1808-1810). Conchyliologie systématique et classification méthodique des coquilles. Paris: Schoell. Vol. 1: pp. lxxxvii + 409 [1808]. Vol. 2: pp. 676 + 16 (1810) ]

Sagdidae